It's the World Gone Crazy is the thirty-seventh album by American singer/guitarist Glen Campbell, released in 1981 (see 1981 in music). The lead single, "Any Which Way You Can", was the title song to the 1980 movie Any Which Way You Can, the sequel to Every Which Way But Loose.

Track listing

Side 1:

 "Why Don't We Just Sleep on It Tonight" (duet with Tanya Tucker) (John Lewis Parker, Harry Shannon) – 3:05
 "I Don't Want to Know Your Name"  (Micheal Smotherman) – 4:02
 "In Cars" (Jimmy Webb) – 3:05
 "It's the World's Gone Crazy (Cotillion)" (Shel Silverstein, Waylon Jennings) – 2:38
 "Rollin'" (Joe Rainey, Jack Tempchin) – 3:30
 
Side 2:

 "Nothing Quite Like Love" (Micheal Smotherman) – 3:57
 "A Daisy a Day" (Jud Strunk) – 3:40
 "Any Which Way You Can" (Milton Brown, Steve Dorff, Snuff Garrett) – 3:14
 "It's Your World" (Joe Rainey) – 3:46
 "Shoulder to Shoulder" (duet with Tanya Tucker) (Henry Gaffney) – 3:25

Personnel

Glen Campbell – vocals, acoustic guitars, electric guitars
Tanya Tucker – vocals
Bill McCubbin – bass guitar
Steve Turner – drums
T.J. Kuenster – keyboards
Craig Fall – acoustic guitars, electric guitars, steel guitars
Larry Muhoberac – piano
Joe Rainey – Hammond B-3 organ, harmonica
Micheal Smotherman – Wurlitzer piano
Nick DeCaro – accordion
David Foster – piano
Larry Byrom, Fred Tackett, Billy Joe Walker Jr. – guitars
Tom Saviano – saxophone on "I Don't Want to Know Your Name"
Jay Dee Maness – steel guitar on "Any Which Way You Can"

Production
Executive Producer – Charles Koppelman
Producers – Gary Klein for The Entertainment Company, Snuff Garrett ("Any Which Way You Can")
Strings – Nick DeCaro, Steve Dorff
Conductor – Edward Karam 
Concertmaster – Harry Bluestone
Engineers – John Arrias, Grover Helsley
Photography – Mike Rothwell

Chart performance

Album

Singles

References

Glen Campbell albums
1981 albums
Capitol Records albums
Albums produced by Snuff Garrett
Albums produced by Gary Klein (producer)